Pierre-Marie Deloof (born 29 September 1964, in Bruges) is a Belgian rower.

References 
 
 

1964 births
Living people
Belgian male rowers
Sportspeople from Bruges
Rowers at the 1984 Summer Olympics
Olympic silver medalists for Belgium
Olympic rowers of Belgium
Olympic medalists in rowing
Medalists at the 1984 Summer Olympics
20th-century Belgian people